Abul Kalam Azad (born 1 January 1967 in Barpeta, Assam) is an All India United Democratic Front politician from Assam. He was elected in Assam Legislative Assembly election in 2011 and 2016 from Bhabanipur constituency.

References 

1967 births
Living people
All India United Democratic Front politicians
People from Barpeta
Assam MLAs 2006–2011
Assam MLAs 2016–2021